James Rawson (born 7 July 1965 in Newark, Nottinghamshire) is a British table tennis player who competed at every Summer Paralympic Games between 1984 and 2008, winning five medals. He has also competed at World Championships in Assen 1990,Taipei 2002 where he won Team silver with Neil Robinson and individual Bronze defeating Guertler from Germany

Table tennis career
He won a gold medal in the men's team Class 3 event at the 1992 Barcelona Paralympics, alongside Neil Robinson and Phillip Evans, defeating Germany in the final.

At the 1996 Atlanta Paralympics, he won a bronze medal in the Class 3 team event, again with Robinson, and a further bronze in the Class 3 singles event, with Robinson taking the silver.

Rawson won silver in the Men's Class 3 team event at the 2000 Sydney Paralympics alongside Robinson and Stefan Trofan. The same trio retained their silver medal at the 2004 Athens Paralympics, losing in the gold medal match to South Korea.

Rawson competed at the 2008 Beijing Paralympics in the Men's individual Class 3 event without winning a medal; alongside Robinson and Arnie Chan he came fourth in the Men's team Class 3, losing the bronze medal match to host nation China.

References

1965 births
English male table tennis players
Table tennis players at the 1984 Summer Paralympics
Table tennis players at the 1988 Summer Paralympics
Table tennis players at the 1992 Summer Paralympics
Table tennis players at the 1996 Summer Paralympics
Table tennis players at the 2000 Summer Paralympics
Table tennis players at the 2004 Summer Paralympics
Table tennis players at the 2008 Summer Paralympics
Paralympic table tennis players of Great Britain
Medalists at the 1992 Summer Paralympics
Medalists at the 1996 Summer Paralympics
Medalists at the 2000 Summer Paralympics
Medalists at the 2004 Summer Paralympics
Paralympic medalists in table tennis
Paralympic gold medalists for Great Britain
Paralympic silver medalists for Great Britain
Paralympic bronze medalists for Great Britain
Living people